Sanyi is a railway station on the Taiwan Railways Administration Taichung line and Former Mountain line. It is located in Sanyi Township, Miaoli County, Taiwan.

History
The station was opened on 7 October 1903.

Around the station
 Huoyan Mountain Ecology Museum
 Sanyi Wood Sculpture Museum
 West Lake Resortopia

See also
 List of railway stations in Taiwan

1903 establishments in Taiwan
Railway stations in Miaoli County
Railway stations opened in 1903
Railway stations served by Taiwan Railways Administration